Samuel Israel Matenga (born 8 May 1998) is a New Zealand rugby union player who plays for the Tasman Mako in the Bunnings NPC competition and the Seattle Seawolves in Major League Rugby. His position of choice is prop.

Tasman 
He played 3 games for Tasman in 2019. In September 2020 he was named in the Tasman Mako squad for the 2020 Mitre 10 Cup. Matenga was part of the side as the Mako went on to win their second premiership title in a row. He had a stand out season in the 2021 Bunnings NPC as Tasman again made the premiership final, this time losing to  23–20.

References

External links
itsrugby.co.uk profile

1998 births
Living people
New Zealand rugby union players
People educated at Gisborne Boys' High School
Rugby union players from Gisborne, New Zealand
Rugby union props
Seattle Seawolves players
Tasman rugby union players